Bandalli  is a village in the southern state of Karnataka, India. It is located in the Kollegal taluk of Chamarajanagar district.

Bandalli betta is the place you can have a good trek with having permission from Kaveri Vannya Dhama Bandalli.

Nearest places to visit

1 Hukunda (approx. 15 km)

2 Mekedhatu (20 km)

3 Bandalli betta

4 Bandallidurga - fort (less than 1 km)

5 Kootle Basaveshwara Betta (20 km)

6 Sangama (25  km)

7 Chikkaluru (25  km)

8 Mutatti (35  km)

Demographics
 India census, Bandalli had a population of 9418 with 4936 males and 4482 females.

See also
 Chamarajanagar
 Districts of Karnataka

References

External links
 http://Chamarajanagar.nic.in/

Villages in Chamarajanagar district